Chen Yuyi (1090 – 1138) was a Chinese poet and politician of the Song dynasty.

Biography
Chen was born in Luoyang, Henan in 1090 to an official family, with his ancestral home in Jingzhao (today's Xi'an). After he acquired his jinshi in the Imperial examination in 1113, he was assigned to the central government. He retired in 1116. Two years later he returned to the operating post. In 1120, Chen was in mourning at home after his mother died. Two years later, he became an official in the central government under the recommendation of Ge Shengzhong.

In 1127, the Jin army seized Bianjing (today's Kaifeng, Henan), the Song army was routed. After the perdition of the Northern Song dynasty, Emperor Gaozong fled to Shaoxing and established the Southern Song dynasty. Chen fled with his family, moving from Hubei, to Hunan, and then Guangdong, and ending up in Fujian. In 1131, he came to Lin'an, capital of Southern Song dynasty. He was appointed as an official in the newly founded central government. He died in 1138, aged 49.

His biography was included in the History of Song.

References

Bibliography

1090 births
Politicians from Luoyang
1138 deaths
Song dynasty politicians from Henan
Poets from Henan
12th-century Chinese poets
Writers from Luoyang